Pilosella flagellaris (synonym Hieracium flagellare) is a European plant species in the tribe Cichorieae within the family Asteraceae. It is native to Europe but naturalized in scattered locations in the United States and Canada.

One stalk will produce 2-4 flower heads in a flat-topped array. Each head has 90–120 yellow ray flowers but no disc flowers.

References

flagellaris
Flora of Europe
Plants described in 1814